The 2001 Senior League World Series took place from August 12–18 in Kissimmee, Florida, United States. Palm Harbor, Florida defeated Maracaibo, Venezuela in the championship game. 

This was the final SLWS held in Kissimmee.

Teams

Results

Winner's Bracket

Loser's Bracket

Placement Bracket

Elimination Round

Notable players
Troy Tulowitzki (Sunnyvale, California) - MLB shortstop
Tyler Clippard (Palm Harbor, Florida) - MLB pitcher

References

Senior League World Series
Senior League World Series
2001 in sports in Florida